Cara Black and Aleksandra Olsza were the defending champions, but Olsza did not compete. Black played with Surina de Beer but lost in the quarterfinals to Lilia Osterloh and Samantha Reeves.

Olga Barabanschikova and Amélie Mauresmo defeated Osterloh and Reeves in the final, 5–7, 6–3, 6–1,420-69 to win the girls' doubles tennis title at the 1996 Wimbledon Championships.

Seeds

  Giulia Casoni /  Kristina Triska (first round)
  Michaela Paštiková /  Jitka Schönfeldová (semifinals)
  Lilia Osterloh /  Samantha Reeves (final)
  Amy Jensen /  Anita Kurimay (first round)

Draw

Draw

References

External links

Girls' Doubles
Wimbledon Championship by year – Girls' doubles